Hollingsworth–Hines Farm is a historic home and farm complex and national historic district located near Turkey, Sampson County, North Carolina.  The house was built between 1785 and 1800, and is a two-story, log dwelling with a later rear ell.  Also on the property are a number of contributing farm outbuildings, most notable are two log smokehouses, the large six stall barn, two handsome packhouses, a very unusual arrangement of three connected tobacco barns and the family cemetery.

It was added to the National Register of Historic Places in 1986.

References

Log houses in the United States
Farms on the National Register of Historic Places in North Carolina
Historic districts on the National Register of Historic Places in North Carolina
Houses completed in 1790
Buildings and structures in Sampson County, North Carolina
National Register of Historic Places in Sampson County, North Carolina
Log buildings and structures on the National Register of Historic Places in North Carolina